Tsuyoshi Nakasako (born January 29, 1974) is a Japanese retired heavyweight kickboxer who competed in K-1. During his ten-year career from 1998 until 2008, he fought a variety of K-1 champions including Ernesto Hoost, Peter Aerts, Remy Bonjasky, Mark Hunt, and Andy Hug.

Career
Nakasako made his professional kickboxing debut on May 24 at the K-1 Braves '98 event in Fukuoka. In a dominant effort, he earned a TKO victory over taekwondo champion Pierre Guenette. Three months later, he reached the finals of the K-1 Japan Grand Prix '98 tournament before suffering his first defeat: a majority decision loss to former world champion Masaaki Satake. Losses Stan Longinidis and Andy Hug followed, but Nakasako rebounded with wins over world champion Dewey Cooper and Muay Thai exponent Tofan Pirani. He reached the semifinals of the K-1 Spirits '99 and K-1 Andy Memorial events, but endured decision losses to Nobu Hayashi and Musashi, respectively.

Despite an eventual TKO loss, Nakasako made a strong showing against K-1 World Grand Prix 2001 winner Mark Hunt at K-1 Rising 2002, scoring a knockdown with a kick to the head and pressuring the champion effectively. This was followed shortly afterwards with a disqualification win over the debuting Bob Sapp at K-1 Survival 2002, awarded after Sapp shoved Nakasako into the corner, threw him to the ground and repeatedly struck him while he was down. Nakasako next entered the K-1 Andy Spirits tournament, where he dominantly made his way to the finals and fought five rounds to an eventual decision loss against Musashi.

At K-1 Burning 2004, Naksako faced Remy Bonjasky in the Dutchman's first match after winning the K-1 World Grand Prix 2003. After a dynamic bout wherein the Japanese fighter appropriated his opponent's signature flying knee attacks, Nakasako eventually suffered a TKO in the closing seconds of the final round. He came back with an impressive first round knockout of Mavrick Harvery, effectively dominating the cage fighter. Further tournament competition followed, with Nakasako continuing to fall short but nevertheless achieving the occasional surprising victory, such as his defeat of his rival Kaoklai Kaennorsing at the K-1 World Grand Prix 2006 in Seoul.

Naksako entered his final tournament - the K-1 World Grand Prix 2008 in Fukuoka - on June 29. After defeating Bernard Ackah in the quarterfinals, he moved on to face karate champ Ewerton Teixeira and lost by unanimous decision. This was his last match to date, leaving him with a professional record of 19 wins, 26 losses, and 1 draw.

Titles
K-1 Andy Spirits 2002 Finalist
K-1 Japan Grand Prix '98 Finalist

Kickboxing record

|-
|-  bgcolor="#FFBBBB"
| 2008-06-29 || Loss ||align=left| Ewerton Teixeira || K-1 World Grand Prix 2008 in Fukuoka Semifinal || Fukuoka, Japan || Decision (Unanimous) || 3 || 3:00 || 19-26-1
|-
|-  bgcolor="#CCFFCC"
| 2008-06-29 || Win ||align=left| Bernard Ackah || K-1 World Grand Prix 2008 in Fukuoka Quarterfinal || Fukuoka, Japan || Decision (Unanimous) || 3 || 3:00 || 19-25-1
|-
|-  bgcolor="#CCFFCC"
| 2008-04-13 || Win ||align=left| Takumi Sato || K-1 World Grand Prix 2008 in Yokohama || Yokohama, Japan || Decision (Unanimous) || 3 || 3:00 || 18-25-1
|-
|-  bgcolor="#FFBBBB"
| 2007-08-11 || Loss ||align=left| Alexander Pitchkounov || K-1 World Grand Prix 2007 in Las Vegas Quarterfinal || Las Vegas, USA || Decision (Unanimous) || 3 || 3:00 || 17-25-1
|-
|-  bgcolor="#FFBBBB"
| 2007-03-04 || Loss ||align=left| Zabit Samedov || K-1 World Grand Prix 2007 in Yokohama || Yokohama, Japan || Decision (Majority) || 3 || 3:00 || 17-24-1
|-
|-  bgcolor="#FFBBBB"
| 2006-07-30 || Loss ||align=left| Björn Bregy || K-1 World Grand Prix 2006 in Sapporo || Sapporo, Japan || KO (Right hook) || 1 || 2:35 || 17-23-1
|-
|-  bgcolor="#FFBBBB"
| 2006-06-03 || Loss ||align=left| Yusuke Fujimoto || K-1 World Grand Prix 2006 in Seoul Semifinal || Seoul, South Korea || Decision (Majority) || 3 || 3:00 || 17-22-1
|-
|-  bgcolor="#CCFFCC"
| 2006-06-03 || Win ||align=left| Kaoklai Kaennorsing || K-1 World Grand Prix 2006 in Seoul Quarterfinal || Seoul, South Korea || Decision (Unanimous) || 3 || 3:00 || 17-21-1
|-
|-  bgcolor="#FFBBBB"
| 2005-08-22 || Loss ||align=left| Kaoklai Kaennorsing || Titans 2nd || Tokyo, Japan || Decision (Unanimous || 3 || 3:00 || 16-21-1
|-
|-  bgcolor="#FFBBBB"
| 2005-06-14 || Loss ||align=left| Hiraku Hori || K-1 World Grand Prix 2005 in Hiroshima Quarterfinal || Hiroshima, Japan || Decision (Unanimous) || 3 || 3:00 || 16-20-1
|-
|-  bgcolor="#FFBBBB"
| 2005-04-30 || Loss ||align=left| Mark Selbee || K-1 World Grand Prix 2005 in Las Vegas Quarterfinal || Las Vegas, USA || Decision (Unanimous) || 3 || 3:00 || 16-19-1
|-
|-  bgcolor="#FFBBBB"
| 2004-07-17 || Loss ||align=left| Kaoklai Kaennorsing || K-1 World Grand Prix 2004 in Seoul Semifinal || Seoul, South Korea || Decision (Unanimous) || 3 || 3:00 || 16-18-1
|-
|-  bgcolor="#CCFFCC"
| 2004-07-17 || Win ||align=left| Myeon Ju Lee || K-1 World Grand Prix 2004 in Seoul Quarterfinal || Seoul, South Korea || Decision (Unanimous) || 3 || 3:00 || 16-17-1
|-
|-  bgcolor="#FFBBBB"
| 2004-06-26 || Loss ||align=left| Nobu Hayashi || K-1 Beast 2004 in Shizuoka Quarterfinal || Shizuoka, Japan || Decision (Unanimous) || 3 || 3:00 || 15-17-1
|-
|-  bgcolor="#CCFFCC"
| 2004-03-14 || Win ||align=left| Mavrick Harvey || K-1 Beast 2004 in Niigata || Niigata, Japan || KO || 1 || 1:30 || 15-16-1
|-
|-  bgcolor="#FFBBBB"
| 2004-02-15 || Loss ||align=left| Remy Bonjasky || K-1 Burning 2004 || Okinawa, Japan || KO (Left high kick) || 3 || 2:54 || 14-16-1
|-
|-  bgcolor="#FFBBBB"
| 2003-09-21 || Loss ||align=left| Hiromi Amada || K-1 Survival 2003 Quarterfinal || Yokohama, Japan || 2nd Ext.R Decision (Unanimous) || 5 || 3:00 || 14-15-1
|-
|-  bgcolor="#FFBBBB"
| 2003-06-29 || Loss ||align=left| Peter Aerts || K-1 Beast II 2003 || Saitama, Japan || KO (High kick) || 2 || 1:42 || 14-14-1
|-
|-  bgcolor="#FFBBBB"
| 2003-04-06 || Loss ||align=left| Mike Bernardo || K-1 Beast 2003 || Yamagata, Japan || TKO || 2 || 1:02 || 14-13-1
|-
|-  bgcolor="#FFBBBB"
| 2002-09-22 || Loss ||align=left| Musashi || K-1 Andy Spirits Final || Osaka, Japan || 2nd Ext.R Decision (Unanimous) || 5 || 3:00 || 14-12-1
|-
! style=background:white colspan=9 |
|-
|-  bgcolor="#CCFFCC"
| 2002-09-22 || Win ||align=left| Yusuke Fujimoto || K-1 Andy Spirits Semifinals || Osaka, Japan || KO (Punch) || 2 || 2:18 || 14-11-1
|-
|-  bgcolor="#CCFFCC"
| 2002-09-22 || Win ||align=left| Ryuta Noji || K-1 Andy Spirits Quarterfinal || Osaka, Japan || Decision (Unanimous) || 3 || 3:00 || 13-11-1
|-
|-  bgcolor="#CCFFCC"
| 2002-06-02 || Win ||align=left| Bob Sapp || K-1 Survival 2002 || Toyama, Japan || DQ || 1 || 1:30 || 12-11-1
|-
! style=background:white colspan=9 |
|-
|-  bgcolor="#FFBBBB"
| 2002-04-21 || Loss ||align=left| Ernesto Hoost || K-1 Burning 2002 || Hiroshima, Japan || KO || 1 || 1:46 || 11-11-1
|-
|-  bgcolor="#FFBBBB"
| 2002-01-27 || Loss ||align=left| Mark Hunt || K-1 Rising 2002 || Shizuoka, Japan || TKO (Referee stoppage) || 2 || 2:55 || 11-10-1
|-
|-  bgcolor="#FFBBBB"
| 2001-08-19 || Loss ||align=left| Musashi || K-1 Andy Memorial Semifinal || Saitama, Japan || Decision (Unanimous) || 3 || 3:00 || 11-9-1
|-
|-  bgcolor="#CCFFCC"
| 2001-08-19 || Win ||align=left| Great Kusatsu || K-1 Andy Memorial Quarterfinal || Saitama, Japan || Decision (Unanimous) || 3 || 3:00 || 11-8-1
|-
|-  bgcolor="#CCFFCC"
| 2001-06-24 || Win ||align=left| Shingo Koyasu || K-1 Survival 2001 || Sendai, Japan || Decision (Unanimous) || 3 || 3:00 || 10-8-1
|-
|-  bgcolor="#FFBBBB"
| 2001-03-17 || Loss ||align=left| Glaube Feitosa || K-1 Gladiators 2001 || Yokohama, Japan || KO (Left high kick) || 2 || 0:57 || 9-8-1
|-
|-  bgcolor="#FFBBBB"
| 2001-01-30 || Loss ||align=left| Toru Oishi || K-1 Rising 2001 || Shikoku, Japan || Decision (Majority) || 5 || 3:00 || 9-7-1
|-
|-  bgcolor="#FFBBBB"
| 2000-08-20 || Loss ||align=left| Francisco Filho || K-1 World Grand Prix 2000 in Yokohama Quarterfinal || Yokohama, Japan || Decision (Unanimous) || 3 || 3:00 || 9-6-1
|-
|-  bgcolor="#FFBBBB"
| 2000-07-07 || Loss ||align=left| An Hu || K-1 Spirits 2000 Quarterfinal || Sendai, Japan || TKO (Stoppage/Punches) || 3 || 0:45 || 9-5-1
|-
|-  bgcolor="#CCFFCC"
| 2000-05-28 || Win ||align=left| Noboru Uchida || K-1 Survival 2000 || Sapporo, Japan || Decision (Unanimous) || 3 || 3:00 || 9-4-1
|-
|-  bgcolor="#c5d2ea"
| 2000-03-19 || Draw ||align=left| Stan Longinidis || K-1 Burning 2000 || Yokohama, Japan || Decision draw (1-0) || 5 || 3:00 || 8-4-1
|-
|-  bgcolor="#CCFFCC"
| 2000-01-25 || Win ||align=left| Marten Simons || K-1 Rising 2000 || Nagasaki, Japan || Decision (Unanimous) || 3 || 3:00 || 8-4-0
|-
|-  bgcolor="#FFBBBB"
| 1999-08-22 || Loss ||align=left| Nobu Hayashi || K-1 Spirits '99 Semifinal || Tokyo, Japan || Decision (Majority) || 3 || 3:00 || 7-4-0
|-
|-  bgcolor="#CCFFCC"
| 1999-08-22 || Win ||align=left| Toru Oishi || K-1 Spirits '99 Quarterfinal || Tokyo, Japan || Decision (Majority) ||  || 3:00 || 7-3-0
|-
|-  bgcolor="#CCFFCC"
| 1999-08-22 || Win ||align=left| Yasuhiro Anbe || K-1 Spirits '99 Eighth-final || Tokyo, Japan || 2nd Ext.R Decision (Unanimous) || 5 || 3:00 || 6-3-0
|-
|-  bgcolor="#CCFFCC"
| 1999-07-18 || Win ||align=left| Tofan Pirani || K-1 Dream '99 || Nagoya, Japan || KO (Right hook) || 1 || 0:15 || 5-3-0
|-
|-  bgcolor="#CCFFCC"
| 1999-03-22 || Win ||align=left| Dewey Cooper || K-1 The Challenge '99 || Tokyo, Japan || KO (Right high kick) || 2 || 2:44 || 4-3-0
|-
|-  bgcolor="#FFBBBB"
| 1999-02-03 || Loss ||align=left| Andy Hug || K-1 Rising Sun '99 || Tokyo, Japan || KO (Right spinning heel kick) || 2 || 0:22 || 3-3-0
|-
|-  bgcolor="#FFBBBB"
| 1998-10-28 || Loss ||align=left| Stan Longinidis || K-1 Japan '98 Kamikaze || Tokyo, Japan || TKO (Doctor stoppage) || 4 || 0:30 || 3-2-0
|-
! style=background:white colspan=9 |
|-
|-  bgcolor="#FFBBBB"
| 1998-08-28 || Loss ||align=left| Masaaki Satake || K-1 Japan Grand Prix '98 Final || Tokyo, Japan || Decision (Majority) || 3 || 3:00 || 3-1-0
|-
! style=background:white colspan=9 |
|-
|-  bgcolor="#CCFFCC"
| 1998-08-28 || Win ||align=left| Ryo Takigawa || K-1 Japan Grand Prix '98 Semifinal || Tokyo, Japan || KO || 1 || 0:56 || 3-0-0
|-
|-  bgcolor="#CCFFCC"
| 1998-08-28 || Win ||align=left| Mitsuya Nagai || K-1 Japan Grand Prix '98 Quarterfinal || Tokyo, Japan || TKO (Left high kick) || 2 || 2:55 || 2-0-0
|-
|-  bgcolor="#CCFFCC"
| 1998-05-24 || Win ||align=left| Pierre Guenette || K-1 Braves '98 || Fukuoka, Japan || TKO (Punch) || 2 || 2:14 || 1-0-0
|-
|-
| colspan=9 | Legend:

See also 
List of male kickboxers
List of K-1 Events

References

External links
Official K-1 website
Tsuyoshi Nakasako K-1 profile

1974 births
Living people
Japanese male kickboxers
Heavyweight kickboxers
Japanese male karateka
People from Toyonaka, Osaka